Baboucarr Njie (born 5 June 1995) is a Gambian footballer who currently plays for USL Championship club Phoenix Rising FC.

Career
Njie played college soccer at North Carolina Wesleyan College for two consecutive seasons, skipping 2018 and returning for his junior year in 2019. During his time with the Battling Bishops, Njie made 57 appearances, scoring 34 goals and tallying 19 assists. During his 2018 season, Njie played in the USL PDL with North Carolina FC U23, where he made 4 appearances.

14 February 2020, it was announced that Njie would sign for USL Championship side Atlanta United 2. He made his debut for Atlanta on 29 July 2020, starting against The Miami FC.

Njie signed with USL Championship side Rio Grande Valley FC on 6 April 2021.

Njie signed with Phoenix Rising FC on 13 December 2021.

References

1995 births
Living people
Gambian footballers
Gambian expatriate footballers
Expatriate soccer players in the United States
Gambian expatriate sportspeople in the United States
Soccer players from Washington, D.C.
Association football midfielders
North Carolina FC U23 players
Atlanta United 2 players
Rio Grande Valley FC Toros players
Phoenix Rising FC players
USL League Two players
USL Championship players